The Desert Bride can refer to:

 The Desert Bride (1928 film), a 1928 American film
 The Desert Bride (2017 film), a 2017 Argentine-Chilean film